Radio Patrol is a 1932 American pre-Code crime film directed by Edward L. Cahn, written by Tom Reed and Richard Schayer, and starring Robert Armstrong, Russell Hopton, Lila Lee, June Clyde, Sidney Toler and Andy Devine. It was released on June 2, 1932, by Universal Pictures.

Plot

Cast 
Robert Armstrong as Bill Kennedy
Russell Hopton as Pat Bourke
Lila Lee as Sue Kennedy
June Clyde as Vern Wiley
Sidney Toler as Sgt. Tom Keogh
Andy Devine as Pete Wiley
Harry Woods as Kloskey
Onslow Stevens as Carl Hughes
John Lester Johnson as Smokey Johnson
Noel Madison as Tony
Dewey Robinson as Little Erny
Herman Bing as Schwabacher, the Funeral Director (unaccredited)

References

External links 
 

1932 films
1930s English-language films
American crime films
1932 crime films
Universal Pictures films
Films directed by Edward L. Cahn
American black-and-white films
1930s American films
Films with screenplays by Richard Schayer